The Suez Crisis, or the Second Arab–Israeli war, also called the Tripartite Aggression in the Arab world and the Sinai War in Israel,
was an invasion of Egypt in late 1956 by Israel, followed by the United Kingdom and France. The aims were to regain control of the Suez Canal for the Western powers and to remove Egyptian president Gamal Abdel Nasser, who had just swiftly nationalised the foreign-owned Suez Canal Company, which administered the canal. Israel's primary objective was to re-open the blocked Straits of Tiran. After the fighting had started, political pressure from the United States, the Soviet Union, and the United Nations led to a withdrawal by the three invaders. The episode humiliated the United Kingdom and France and strengthened Nasser.

On 26 July 1956, Nasser nationalised the Suez Canal Company, which prior to that was owned primarily by British and French shareholders. On 29 October, Israel invaded the Egyptian Sinai. Britain and France issued a joint ultimatum to cease fire, which was ignored. On 5 November, Britain and France landed paratroopers along the Suez Canal. Before the Egyptian forces were defeated, they had blocked the canal to all shipping by sinking 40 ships in the canal. It later became clear that Israel, France and Britain had conspired to plan the invasion. The three allies had attained a number of their military objectives, but the canal was useless. Heavy political pressure from the United States and the USSR led to a withdrawal. U.S. president Dwight D. Eisenhower had strongly warned Britain not to invade; he threatened serious damage to the British financial system by selling the U.S. government's pound sterling bonds. Historians conclude the crisis "signified the end of Great Britain's role as one of the world's major powers".

The Suez Canal was closed from October 1956 until March 1957. Israel fulfilled some of its objectives, such as attaining freedom of navigation through the Straits of Tiran, which Egypt had blocked to Israeli shipping since 1948–1950.

As a result of the conflict, the United Nations created the UNEF Peacekeepers to police the Egyptian–Israeli border, British prime minister Anthony Eden resigned, Canadian external affairs minister Lester Pearson won the Nobel Peace Prize, and the USSR may have been emboldened to invade Hungary.

Background

History of the Suez Canal 

The Suez Canal was opened in 1869, after ten years of work financed by the French and Egyptian governments. The canal was operated by the Universal Company of the Suez Maritime Canal, an Egyptian-chartered company; the area surrounding the canal remained sovereign Egyptian territory and the only land-bridge between Africa and Asia.

The canal instantly became strategically important, as it provided the shortest ocean link between the Mediterranean Sea and the Indian Ocean. The canal eased commerce for trading nations and particularly helped European colonial powers to gain and govern their colonies.

In 1875, as a result of debt and financial crisis, Egypt was forced to sell its shares in the canal operating company to the British government of Benjamin Disraeli. They were willing buyers and obtained a 44% share in the Suez Canal Company for £4 million (£472 million in 2020). This maintained the majority shareholdings of the mostly-French private investors. With the 1882 invasion and occupation of Egypt, the UK took de facto control of the country as well as the canal proper, its finances and operations. The 1888 Convention of Constantinople declared the canal a neutral zone under British protection. In ratifying it, the Ottoman Empire agreed to permit international shipping to pass freely through the canal, in time of war and peace. The Convention came into force in 1904, the same year as the Entente cordiale between Britain and France.

Despite this convention, the strategic importance of the Suez Canal and its control were proven during the Russo-Japanese War of 1904–1905, after Japan and Britain entered into a separate bilateral agreement. Following the Japanese surprise attack on the Russian Pacific Fleet based at Port Arthur, the Russians sent reinforcements from their fleet in the Baltic Sea. The British denied the Russian Baltic Fleet use of the canal after the Dogger Bank incident and forced it to steam around the Cape of Good Hope in Africa, giving the Imperial Japanese Armed Forces time to consolidate their position in East Asia.

The importance of the canal as a strategic intersection was again apparent during the First World War, when Britain and France closed the canal to non-Allied shipping. The attempt by the German-led Ottoman Fourth Army to storm the canal in February 1915 led the British to commit 100,000 troops to the defence of Egypt for the rest of the war.

Oil 
The canal continued to be strategically important after the Second World War as a conduit for the shipment of oil. Petroleum business historian Daniel Yergin wrote of the period: "In 1948, the canal abruptly lost its traditional rationale. ... [British] control over the canal could no longer be preserved on grounds that it was critical to the defence either of India or of an empire that was being liquidated. And yet, at exactly the same moment, the canal was gaining a new role—as the highway not of empire, but of oil. ... By 1955, petroleum accounted for half of the canal's traffic, and, in turn, two thirds of Europe's oil passed through it".

At the time, Western Europe imported two million barrels per day from the Middle East, 1,200,000 by tanker through the canal, and another 800,000 via pipeline from the Persian Gulf to the Mediterranean, where tankers received it. The US imported another 300,000 barrels daily from the Middle East. Though pipelines linked the oil fields of the Kingdom of Iraq and the Persian Gulf states to the Mediterranean, these routes were prone to suffer from instability, which led British leaders to prefer to use the sea route through the Suez Canal. As it was, the rise of super-tankers for shipping Middle East oil to Europe, which were too big to use the Suez Canal, meant that British policy-makers greatly overestimated the importance of the canal. By 2000, only 8 percent of the imported oil in Britain arrived via the Suez canal with the rest coming via the Cape route.

In August 1956 the Royal Institute of International Affairs published a report titled "Britain and the Suez Canal" revealing government perception of the Suez area. It reiterates several times the strategic necessity of the Suez Canal to the United Kingdom, including the need to meet military obligations under the Manila Pact in the Far East and the Baghdad Pact in Iraq, Iran, or Pakistan. The report also points out that the canal had been used in wartime to transport materiel and personnel from and to the UK's close allies in Australia and New Zealand, and might be vital for such purposes in future. The report also cites the amount of material and oil that passes through the canal to the United Kingdom, and the economic consequences of the canal being put out of commission, concluding:

After 1945 
In the aftermath of the Second World War, Britain's military strength was spread throughout the region, including the vast military complex at Suez with a garrison of some 80,000, making it one of the largest military installations in the world. The Suez base was considered an important part of Britain's strategic position in the Middle East; however, it became a source of growing tension in Anglo-Egyptian relations.

Egypt's post-war domestic politics were experiencing a radical change, prompted in no small part by economic instability, inflation, and unemployment. Unrest began to manifest itself in the growth of radical political groups, such as the Muslim Brotherhood in Egypt, and an increasingly hostile attitude towards Britain and its presence in the country. Added to this anti-British fervour was the role Britain had played in the creation of Israel.

In October 1951, the Egyptian government unilaterally abrogated the Anglo-Egyptian Treaty of 1936, the terms of which granted Britain a lease on the Suez base for 20 more years. Britain refused to withdraw from Suez, relying upon its treaty rights, as well as the presence of the Suez garrison. The price of such a course of action was a steady escalation in violent hostility towards Britain and British troops in Egypt, which the Egyptian authorities did little to curb.

On 25 January 1952, British forces attempted to disarm a troublesome auxiliary police force barracks in Ismailia, resulting in the deaths of 41 Egyptians. This in turn led to anti-Western riots in Cairo resulting in heavy damage to property and the deaths of several foreigners, including 11 British citizens. This proved to be a catalyst for the removal of the Egyptian monarchy. On 23 July 1952 a military coup by the Egyptian nationalist 'Free Officers Movement'—led by Muhammad Neguib and future Egyptian President Gamal Abdul Nasser—overthrew King Farouk and established an Egyptian republic.

Post–Egyptian Revolution period 

In the 1950s, the Middle East was dominated by four interlinked conflicts:
 the Cold War, the geopolitical battle for influence between the United States and the Soviet Union;
 the Arab Cold War, the race between different Arab states for the leadership of the Arab world;
 the anti-colonial struggle of Arab nationalists against the two remaining imperial powers, Britain and France, in particular the Algerian War;
 and the Arab–Israeli conflict, the political and military conflict between the Arab countries and Israel.

Egypt and Britain 
Britain's desire to mend Anglo-Egyptian relations in the wake of the coup saw the country strive for rapprochement throughout 1953 and 1954. Part of this process was the agreement, in 1953, to terminate British rule in Sudan by 1956 in return for Cairo's abandoning of its claim to suzerainty over the Nile Valley region. In October 1954, Britain and Egypt concluded the Anglo-Egyptian Agreement of 1954 on the phased evacuation of British Armed Forces troops from the Suez base, the terms of which agreed to withdrawal of all troops within 20 months, maintenance of the base to be continued, and for Britain to hold the right to return for seven years. The Suez Canal Company was not due to revert to the Egyptian government until 16 November 1968 under the terms of the treaty.

Britain's close relationship with the two Hashemite kingdoms of Iraq and Jordan were of particular concern to Nasser. In particular, Iraq's increasingly amicable relations with Britain were a threat to Nasser's desire to see Egypt as head of the Arab world. The creation of the Baghdad Pact in 1955 seemed to confirm Nasser's fears that Britain was attempting to draw the Eastern Arab World into a bloc centred upon Iraq, and sympathetic to Britain. Nasser's response was a series of challenges to British influence in the region that would culminate in the Suez Crisis.

Egypt and the Arab leadership 
In regard to the Arab leadership, particularly venomous was the feud between Nasser and the Prime Minister of Iraq, Nuri al-Said, for Arab leadership, with the Cairo-based Voice of the Arabs radio station regularly calling for the overthrow of the government in Baghdad. The most important factors that drove Egyptian foreign policy in this period was on the one hand, a determination to see the entire Middle East as Egypt's rightful sphere of influence, and on the other, a tendency on the part of Nasser to fortify his pan-Arabist and nationalist credibility by seeking to oppose any and all Western security initiatives in the Near East.

Despite the establishment of such an agreement with the British, Nasser's position remained tenuous. The loss of Egypt's claim to Sudan, coupled with the continued presence of Britain at Suez for a further two years, led to domestic unrest including an assassination attempt against him in October 1954. The tenuous nature of Nasser's rule caused him to believe that neither his regime, nor Egypt's independence would be safe until Egypt had established itself as head of the Arab world. This would manifest itself in the challenging of British Middle Eastern interests throughout 1955.

US and a defence treaty against the Soviet threat 
The United States, while attempting to erect an alliance in the form of a Middle East Defense Organization to keep the Soviet Union out of the Near East, tried to woo Nasser into this alliance. The central problem for American policy in the Middle East was that this region was perceived as strategically important due to its oil, but the United States, weighed down by defence commitments in Europe and the Far East, lacked sufficient troops to resist a Soviet invasion of the Middle East. In 1952, General Omar Bradley of the U.S. Joint Chiefs of Staff declared at a planning session about what to do in the event of a Soviet invasion of the Near East: "Where will the staff come from? It will take a lot of stuff to do a job there".

As a consequence, American diplomats favoured the creation of a NATO-type organisation in the Near East to provide the necessary military power to deter the Soviets from invading the region. The Eisenhower administration, even more than the Truman administration, saw the Near East as a huge gap into which Soviet influence could be projected, and accordingly required an American-supported security system. American diplomat Raymond Hare later recalled:

The projected Middle East Defense Organization (MEDO) was to be centered on Egypt. A United States National Security Council directive of March 1953 called Egypt the "key" to the Near East and advised that Washington "should develop Egypt as a point of strength".

A major dilemma for American policy was that the two strongest powers in the Near East, Britain and France, were also the nations whose influence many local nationalists most resented. From 1953 onwards, American diplomacy had attempted unsuccessfully to persuade the powers involved in the Near East, both local and imperial, to set aside their differences and unite against the Soviet Union. The Americans took the view that, just as fear of the Soviet Union had helped to end the historic Franco-German enmity, so too could anti-Communism end the more recent Arab–Israeli dispute. It was a source of constant puzzlement to American officials in the 1950s that the Arab states and the Israelis had seemed to have more interest in fighting each other rather than uniting against the Soviet Union. After his visit to the Middle East in May 1953 to drum up support for MEDO, the Secretary of State, John Foster Dulles found much to his astonishment that the Arab states were "more fearful of Zionism than of the Communists".

The policy of the United States was colored by considerable uncertainty as to whom to befriend in the Near East. American policy was torn between a desire to maintain good relations with NATO allies such as Britain and France who were also major colonial powers, and a desire to align Third World nationalists with the Free World camp. Though it would be entirely false to describe the coup deposing King Farouk in July 1952 as a Central Intelligence Agency (CIA) coup, Nasser and his Society of Free Officers were nonetheless in close contact with CIA operatives led by Miles Copeland beforehand (Nasser maintained links with any and all potential allies from the Egyptian Communist Party on the left to the Muslim Brotherhood on the right).

Nasser's friendship with certain CIA officers in Cairo led Washington to vastly overestimate its influence in Egypt. That Nasser was close to CIA officers led the Americans for a time to view Nasser as a CIA "asset". In turn, the British who were aware of Nasser's CIA ties deeply resented this relationship, which they viewed as an American attempt to push them out of Egypt. The principal reason for Nasser's courting of the CIA before the July Revolution of 1952 was his hope that the Americans would act as a restraining influence on the British should Britain decide on intervention to put an end to the revolution (until Egypt renounced it in 1951, the 1936 Anglo-Egyptian treaty allowed Britain the right of intervention against all foreign and domestic threats). In turn, many American officials, such as Ambassador Jefferson Caffery, saw the continued British military presence in Egypt as anachronistic, and viewed the Revolutionary Command Council (as Nasser called his government after the coup) in a highly favourable light.

Caffery was consistently very positive about Nasser in his reports to Washington right up until his departure from Cairo in 1955. The regime of King Farouk was viewed in Washington as weak, corrupt, unstable, and anti-American, so the Free Officers' July coup was welcomed by the United States. As it was, Nasser's contacts with the CIA were not necessary to prevent British intervention against the July coup as Anglo-Egyptian relations had deteriorated so badly in 1951–52 that the British viewed any Egyptian government not headed by King Farouk as a huge improvement. In May 1953, during a meeting with Secretary Dulles, who asked Egypt to join an anti-Soviet alliance, Nasser responded by saying that the Soviet Union has

Dulles informed Nasser of his belief that the Soviet Union was seeking world conquest, that the principal danger to the Near East came from the Kremlin, and urged Nasser to set aside his differences with Britain to focus on countering the Soviet Union. In this spirit, Dulles suggested that Nasser negotiate a deal that would see Egypt assume sovereignty over the canal zone base, but then allow the British to have "technical control" in the same way that Ford auto company provided parts and training to its Egyptian dealers.

Nasser did not share Dulles's fear of the Soviet Union taking over the Middle East, and insisted quite vehemently that he wanted to see the total end of all British influence not only in Egypt, but all the Middle East. The CIA offered Nasser a $3 million bribe if he would join the proposed Middle East Defense Organization; Nasser took the money, but then refused to join. At most, Nasser made it clear to the Americans that he wanted an Egyptian-dominated Arab League to be the principal defence organisation in the Near East, which might be informally associated with the United States.

After he returned to Washington, Dulles advised Eisenhower that the Arab states believed "the United States will back the new state of Israel in aggressive expansion. Our basic political problem ... is to improve the Moslem states' attitudes towards Western democracies because our prestige in that area had been in constant decline ever since the war". The immediate consequence was a new policy of "even-handedness" where the United States very publicly sided with the Arab states in several disputes with Israel in 1953–54. Moreover, Dulles did not share any sentimental regard for the Anglo-American "special relationship", which led the Americans to lean towards the Egyptian side in the Anglo-Egyptian disputes. During the extremely difficult negotiations over the British evacuation of the Suez Canal base in 1954–55, the Americans generally supported Egypt, though at the same time trying hard to limit the extent of the damage that this might cause to Anglo-American relations.

In the same report of May 1953 to President Dwight D. Eisenhower calling for "even-handedness", Dulles stated that the Egyptians were not interested in joining the proposed MEDO; that the Arabs were more interested in their disputes with the British, the French, the Israelis and each other than in standing against the Soviets; and that the "Northern Tier" states of Turkey, Iran and Pakistan were more useful as allies at present than Egypt. Accordingly, the best American policy towards Egypt was to work towards Arab–Israeli peace and the settlement of the Anglo-Egyptian dispute over the British Suez Canal base as the best way of securing Egypt's ultimate adhesion to an American sponsored alliance centered on the "Northern Tier" states.

The "Northern Tier" alliance was achieved in early 1955 with the creation of the Baghdad Pact comprising Pakistan, Iran, Turkey, Iraq and the United Kingdom. The presence of the last two states was due to the British desire to continue to maintain influence in the Middle East, and Nuri Said's wish to associate his country with the West as the best way of counterbalancing the increasing aggressive Egyptian claims to regional predominance. The conclusion of the Baghdad Pact occurred almost simultaneously with a dramatic Israeli reprisal operation on the Gaza Strip on 28 February 1955 in retaliation for Palestinian fedayeen raids into Israel, during which the Israeli Unit 101 commanded by Ariel Sharon did some damage to Egyptian Army forces.

The close occurrence of the two events was mistakenly interpreted by Nasser as part of coordinated Western effort to push him into joining the Baghdad Pact. The signing of the Baghdad Pact and the Gaza raid marked the beginning of the end of Nasser's once good relations with the Americans. In particular, Nasser saw Iraq's participation in the Baghdad Pact as a Western attempt to promote his archenemy Nuri al-Said as an alternative leader of the Arab world.

Nasser and the Soviet bloc 
Instead of siding with either superpower, Nasser took the role of the spoiler and tried to play off the superpowers in order to have them compete with each other in attempts to buy his friendship.

Under the new leadership of Nikita Khrushchev, the Soviet Union was making a major effort to win influence in the so-called Third World. As part of the diplomatic offensive, Khrushchev had abandoned Moscow's traditional line of treating all non-communists as enemies and adopted a new tactic of befriending so-called "non-aligned" nations, which often were led by leaders who were non-Communists, but in varying ways and degrees were hostile towards the West. Khrushchev had realised that by treating non-communists as being the same thing as being anti-communist, Moscow had needlessly alienated many potential friends over the years in the Third World. Under the banner of anti-imperialism, Khrushchev made it clear that the Soviet Union would provide arms to any left-wing government in the Third World as a way of undercutting Western influence.

Chinese Premier Zhou Enlai met Nasser at the 1955 Bandung Conference and was impressed by him. Zhou recommended that Khrushchev treat Nasser as a potential ally. Zhou described Nasser to Khrushchev as a young nationalist who, though no Communist, could if used correctly do much damage to Western interests in the Middle East. Marshal Josip Broz Tito of Yugoslavia, who also came to know Nasser at the Bandung Conference told Khrushchev in a 1955 meeting that "Nasser was a young man without much political experience, but if we give him the benefit of the doubt, we might be able to exert a beneficial influence on him, both for the sake of the Communist movement, and ... the Egyptian people". Traditionally, most of the equipment in the Egyptian military had come from Britain, but Nasser's desire to break British influence in Egypt meant that he was desperate to find a new source of weapons to replace Britain. Nasser had first broached the subject of buying weapons from the Soviet Union in 1954.

Nasser and arms purchases 
Most of all, Nasser wanted the United States to supply arms on a generous scale to Egypt. Nasser refused to promise that any U.S. arms he might buy would not be used against Israel, and rejected out of hand the American demand for a Military Advisory Group to be sent to Egypt as part of the price of arms sales.

Nasser's first choice for buying weapons was the United States. However his frequent anti-Zionist speeches and sponsorship of the Palestinian fedayeen, who made frequent raids into Israel, rendered it difficult for the Eisenhower administration to get the approval of Congress necessary to sell weapons to Egypt. American public opinion was deeply hostile towards selling arms to Egypt that might be used against Israel. Moreover, Eisenhower feared doing so could trigger a Middle Eastern arms race. Eisenhower very much valued the Tripartite Declaration as a way of keeping peace in the Near East. In 1950, in order to limit the extent that the Arabs and the Israelis could engage in an arms race, the three nations which dominated the arms trade in the non-Communist world, namely the United States, the United Kingdom and France had signed the Tripartite Declaration, where they had committed themselves to limiting how much arms they could sell in the Near East, and also to ensuring that any arms sales to one side was matched by arms sales of equal quantity and quality to the other. Eisenhower viewed the Tripartite Declaration, which sharply restricted how many arms Egypt could buy in the West, as one of the key elements in keeping the peace between Israel and the Arabs, and believed that setting off an arms race would inevitably lead to a new war.

The Egyptians made continuous attempts to purchase heavy arms from Czechoslovakia years before the 1955 deal.

Nasser had let it be known, in 1954–55, that he was considering buying weapons from the Soviet Union, and thus coming under Soviet influence, as a way of pressuring the Americans into selling him the arms he desired. Khrushchev, who very much wanted to win the Soviet Union influence in the Middle East, was more than ready to arm Egypt if the Americans proved unwilling. During secret talks with the Soviets in 1955, Nasser's demands for weapons were more than amply satisfied as the Soviet Union had not signed the Tripartite Declaration. The news in September 1955 of the Egyptian purchase of a huge quantity of Soviet arms via Czechoslovakia was greeted with shock and rage in the West, where this was seen as a major increase in Soviet influence in the Near East. In Britain, the increase of Soviet influence in the Near East was seen as an ominous development that threatened to put an end to British influence in the oil-rich region.

France and the Egyptian support for the Algerian rebellion 

Over the same period, the French Premier Guy Mollet, was facing an increasingly serious rebellion in Algeria, where the Algerian National Liberation Front (FLN) rebels were being verbally supported by Egypt via transmissions of the Voice of the Arabs radio, financially supported with Suez Canal revenue and clandestinely owned Egyptian ships were shipping arms to the FLN. Mollet came to perceive Nasser as a major threat. During a visit to London in March 1956, Mollet told Eden his country was faced with an Islamic threat to the very soul of France supported by the Soviet Union. Mollet stated: "All this is in the works of Nasser, just as Hitler's policy was written down in Mein Kampf. Nasser has the ambition to recreate the conquests of Islam. But his present position is largely due to the policy of the West in building up and flattering him".

In a May 1956 gathering of French veterans, Louis Mangin spoke in place of the unavailable Minister of Defence and gave a violently anti-Nasser speech, which compared the Egyptian leader to Hitler. He accused Nasser of plotting to rule the entire Middle East and of seeking to annex Algeria, whose "people live in community with France". Mangin urged France to stand up to Nasser, and being a strong friend of Israel, urged an alliance with that nation against Egypt.

Egypt and Israel 
Prior to 1955, Nasser had pursued efforts to reach peace with Israel and had worked to prevent cross-border Palestinian attacks. In February 1955, Unit 101, an Israeli unit under Ariel Sharon, conducted a raid on the Egyptian Army headquarters in Gaza in retaliation for a Palestinian fedayeen attack that killed an Israeli civilian. As a result of the incident, Nasser began allowing raids into Israel by the Palestinian militants. The raids triggered a series of Israeli reprisal operations, which ultimately contributed to the Suez Crisis.

Franco-Israeli alliance emerges 
Starting in 1949 owing to shared nuclear research, France and Israel started to move towards an alliance. Following the outbreak of the Algerian War in late 1954, France began to ship more and more arms to Israel. In November 1954, the Director-General of Israel's Ministry of Defense Shimon Peres visited Paris, where he was received by the French Defense Minister Marie-Pierre Kœnig, who told him that France would sell Israel any weapons it wanted to buy. By early 1955, France was shipping large amounts of weapons to Israel. In April 1956, following another visit to Paris by Peres, France agreed to totally disregard the Tripartite Declaration, and supply even more weapons to Israel. During the same visit, Peres informed the French that Israel had decided upon war with Egypt in 1956. Peres claimed that Nasser was a genocidal maniac intent upon not only destroying Israel, but also exterminating its people, and as such, Israel wanted a war before Egypt received even more Soviet weapons, and there was still a possibility of victory for the Jewish state. Peres asked for the French, who had emerged as Israel's closest ally by this point, to give Israel all the help they could give in the coming war.

Frustration of British aims 
Throughout 1955 and 1956, Nasser pursued a number of policies that would frustrate British aims throughout the Middle East, and result in increasing hostility between Britain and Egypt. Nasser saw Iraq's inclusion in the Baghdad Pact as indicating that the United States and Britain had sided with his much hated archenemy Nuri as-Said's efforts to be the leader of the Arab world, and much of the motivation for Nasser's turn to an active anti-Western policy starting in 1955 was due to his displeasure with the Baghdad Pact. For Nasser, attendance at such events as the Bandung conference in April 1955 served as both the means of striking a posture as a global leader, and of playing hard to get in his talks with the Americans, especially his demand that the United States sell him vast quantities of arms.

Nasser "played on the widespread suspicion that any Western defence pact was merely veiled colonialism and that Arab disunity and weakness—especially in the struggle with Israel—was a consequence of British machinations." He also began to align Egypt with the kingdom of Saudi Arabia—whose rulers were hereditary enemies of the Hashemites—in an effort to frustrate British efforts to draw Syria, Jordan and Lebanon into the orbit of the Baghdad Pact. Nasser struck a further blow against Britain by negotiating an arms deal with communist Czechoslovakia in September 1955 thereby ending Egypt's reliance on Western arms. Later, other members of the Warsaw Pact also sold arms to Egypt and Syria. In practice, all sales from the Eastern Bloc were authorised by the Soviet Union, as an attempt to increase Soviet influence over the Middle East. This caused tensions in the United States because Warsaw Pact nations now had a strong presence in the region.

Nasser and 1956 events

Nasser and Jordan 
Nasser frustrated British attempts to draw Jordan into the pact by sponsoring demonstrations in Amman, leading King Hussein of Jordan in the Arabization of the Jordanian Army command to dismiss the British commander of the Arab Legion, Sir John Bagot Glubb (known to the Arabs as Glubb Pasha) in March 1956, throwing Britain's Middle Eastern security policy into chaos. After one round of bloody rioting in December 1955 and another in March 1956 against Jordan joining the Baghdad Pact, both instigated by Cairo-based Voice of the Arabs radio station, Hussein believed his throne was in danger. In private, Hussein assured the British that he was still committed to continuing the traditional Hashemite alliance with Britain, and that his sacking of Glubb Pasha and all the other British officers in the Arab Legion were just gestures to appease the rioters.

Nasser and Britain 
British Prime Minister Anthony Eden was especially upset at the sacking of Glubb Pasha, and as one British politician recalled:

After the sacking of Glubb Pasha, which he saw as a grievous blow to British influence, Eden became consumed with an obsessional hatred for Nasser, and from March 1956 onwards, was in private committed to the overthrow of Nasser. The American historian Donald Neff wrote that Eden's often hysterical and overwrought views towards Nasser almost certainly reflected the influence of the amphetamines to which Eden had become addicted following a botched operation in 1953 together with the related effects of sustained sleep deprivation (Eden slept on average about 5 hours per night in early 1956).

Increasingly Nasser came to be viewed in British circles—and in particular by Eden—as a dictator, akin to Benito Mussolini. In the build-up to the crisis, the Labour leader Hugh Gaitskell and the left-leaning tabloid newspaper The Mirror made the first comparison between Nasser and Mussolini. Anglo-Egyptian relations would continue on their downward spiral.

Britain was eager to tame Nasser and looked towards the United States for support. However, Eisenhower strongly opposed British-French military action. America's closest Arab ally, Saudi Arabia, was just as fundamentally opposed to the Hashemite-dominated Baghdad Pact as Egypt, and the U.S. was keen to increase its own influence in the region. The failure of the Baghdad Pact aided such a goal by reducing Britain's dominance over the region. "Great Britain would have preferred to overthrow Nasser; America, however uncomfortable with the 'Czech arms deal', thought it wiser to propitiate him."

The United States and the Aswan High Dam 
On 16 May 1956, Nasser officially recognized the People's Republic of China, which angered the U.S. and Secretary Dulles, a sponsor of the Republic of China. This move, coupled with the impression that the project was beyond Egypt's economic capabilities, caused Eisenhower to withdraw all American financial aid for the Aswan Dam project on 19 July.

The Eisenhower administration believed that if Nasser were able to secure Soviet economic support for the high dam, that would be beyond the capacity of the Soviet Union to support, and in turn would strain Soviet-Egyptian relations. Eisenhower wrote in March 1956 that "If Egypt finds herself thus isolated from the rest of the Arab world, and with no ally in sight except Soviet Russia, she would very quickly get sick of the prospect and would join us in the search for a just and decent peace in the region". Dulles told his brother, CIA director Allen Dulles, "If they [the Soviets] do make this offer we can make a lot of use of it in propaganda within the satellite bloc. You don't get bread because you are being squeezed to build a dam".

Finally, the Eisenhower administration had become very annoyed at Nasser's efforts to play the United States off against the Soviet Union, and refused to finance the Aswan high dam. As early as September 1955, when Nasser announced the purchase of the Soviet military equipment via Czechoslovakia, Dulles had written that competing for Nasser's favor was probably going to be "an expensive process", one that Dulles wanted to avoid as much as possible.

1956 American peace initiative 
In January 1956, to end the incipient arms race in the Middle East (set off by the Soviet Union selling Egypt arms on a scale unlimited by the Tripartite Declaration and with France doing likewise with Israel), which he saw as opening the Near East to Soviet influence, Eisenhower launched a major effort to make peace between Egypt and Israel. Eisenhower sent out his close friend Robert B. Anderson to serve as a secret envoy who would permanently end the Arab–Israeli dispute. During his meetings with Nasser, Anderson offered large quantities of American aid in exchange for a peace treaty with Israel. Nasser demanded the return of Palestinian refugees to Israel, wanted to annex the southern half of Israel and rejected direct talks with Israel. Given Nasser's territorial and refugee-related demands, the Israeli Prime Minister David Ben-Gurion suspected that Nasser was not interested in a settlement. Still, he proposed direct negotiations with Egypt in any level.

A second round of secret diplomacy by Anderson in February 1956 was equally unsuccessful. Nasser sometimes suggested during his talks with Anderson that he was interested in peace with Israel if only the Americans would supply him with unlimited quantities of military and economic aid. In case of Israeli acceptance to the Palestinian right of return and to Egypt annexing the southern half of Israel, Egypt would not accept a peace settlement. The United States or the United Nations would have to present the Israeli acceptance to all Arabs as a basis for peace settlements. It is not clear if Nasser was sincerely interested in peace, or just merely saying what the Americans wanted to hear in the hope of obtaining American funding for the Aswan high dam and American weapons. The truth will likely never be known as Nasser was an intensely secretive man, who managed to hide his true opinions on most issues from both contemporaries and historians. However, the British historian P. J. Vatikitos noted that Nasser's determination to promote Egypt as the world's foremost anti-Zionist state as a way of reinforcing his claim to Arab leadership meant that peace was unlikely.

Hasan Afif El-Hasan says that in 1955–1956 the Americans proposed to Nasser that he solve the Arab–Israeli conflict peacefully in exchange for American finance of the High Dam on the Nile river, but Nasser rejected the offer because it would mean siding with the West (as opposed to remaining neutral) in the Cold War. Since the alternative to a peace agreement was a war with unpredictable consequences, Nasser's refusal to accept the proposal was irrational, according to el-Hasan.

Canal nationalisation 

Nasser's response was the nationalisation of the Suez Canal. On 26 July, in a speech in Alexandria, Nasser gave a riposte to Dulles. During his speech he deliberately pronounced the name of Ferdinand de Lesseps, the builder of the canal, a code-word for Egyptian forces to seize control of the canal and implement its nationalisation. He announced that the Nationalization Law had been published, that all assets of the Suez Canal Company had been frozen, and that stockholders would be paid the price of their shares according to the day's closing price on the Paris Stock Exchange. That same day, Egypt closed the canal to Israeli shipping. Egypt also closed the Straits of Tiran to Israeli shipping, and blockaded the Gulf of Aqaba, in contravention of the Constantinople Convention of 1888. Many argued that this was also a violation of the 1949 Armistice Agreements.

According to the Egyptian historian Abd al-Azim Ramadan, the events leading up to the nationalisation of the Suez Canal Company, as well as other events during Nasser's rule, showed Nasser to be far from a rational, responsible leader. Ramadan notes Nasser's decision to nationalise the Suez Canal without political consultation as an example of his predilection for solitary decision-making.

British response 
The nationalisation surprised Britain and its Commonwealth. There had been no discussion of the canal at the Commonwealth Prime Ministers' Conference in London in late June and early July. Egypt's action, however, threatened British economic and military interests in the region. Prime Minister Eden was under immense domestic pressure from Conservative MPs who drew direct comparisons between the events of 1956 and those of the Munich Agreement in 1938. Since the U.S. government did not support the British protests, the British government decided in favour of military intervention against Egypt to avoid the complete collapse of British prestige in the region.

Eden was hosting a dinner for King Feisal II of Iraq and his Prime Minister, Nuri es-Said, when he learned the canal had been nationalised. They both unequivocally advised Eden to "hit Nasser hard, hit him soon, and hit him by yourself" – a stance shared by the vast majority of the British people in subsequent weeks. "There is a lot of humbug about Suez," Guy Millard, one of Eden's private secretaries, later recorded. "People forget that the policy at the time was extremely popular." Leader of the Opposition Hugh Gaitskell was also at the dinner. He immediately agreed that military action might be inevitable, but warned Eden would have to keep the Americans closely informed. After a session of the House of Commons expressed anger against the Egyptian action on 27 July, Eden justifiably believed that Parliament would support him; Gaitskell spoke for his party when he called the nationalisation a "high-handed and totally unjustifiable step". When Eden made a ministerial broadcast on the nationalisation, Labour declined its right to reply.

However, in the days that followed, Gaitskell's support became more cautious. On 2 August he said of Nasser's behaviour, "It is all very familiar. It is exactly the same that we encountered from Mussolini and Hitler in those years before the war". He cautioned Eden, however, that "[w]e must not, therefore, allow ourselves to get into a position where we might be denounced in the Security Council as aggressors, or where the majority of the Assembly was against us". He had earlier warned Eden that Labour might not support Britain acting alone against Egypt. In two letters to Eden sent on 3 and 10 August 1956, Gaitskell condemned Nasser but again warned that he would not support any action that violated the United Nations Charter. In his letter of 10 August, Gaitskell wrote:

Two dozen Labour MPs issued a statement on 8 August stating that forcing Nasser to denationalise the canal against Egypt's wishes would violate the UN charter. Other opposition politicians were less conditional in their support. Former Labour Foreign Minister Herbert Morrison hinted that he would support unilateral action by the government. Jo Grimond, who became Leader of the Liberal Party that November, thought if Nasser went unchallenged the whole Middle East would go his way.

In Britain, the nationalisation was perceived as a direct threat to British interests. In a letter to the British Ambassador on 10 September 1956, Sir Ivone Kirkpatrick, the Permanent Under-Secretary at the Foreign Office wrote: If we sit back while Nasser consolidates his position and gradually acquires control of the oil-bearing countries, he can and is, according to our information, resolved to wreck us. If Middle Eastern oil is denied to us for a year or two, our gold reserves will disappear. If our gold reserves disappear, the sterling area disintegrates. If the sterling area disintegrates and we have no reserves, we shall not be able to maintain a force in Germany, or indeed, anywhere else. I doubt whether we shall be able to pay for the bare minimum necessary for our defence. And a country that cannot provide for its defence is finished.

Direct military intervention, however, ran the risk of angering Washington and damaging Anglo-Arab relations. As a result, the British government concluded a secret military pact with France and Israel that was aimed at regaining control over the Suez Canal.

French response 
The French Prime Minister Guy Mollet, outraged by Nasser's move, determined that Nasser would not get his way. French public opinion very much supported Mollet, and apart from the French Communist Party, all of the criticism of his government came from the right, who very publicly doubted that a socialist like Mollet had the guts to go to war with Nasser. During an interview with publisher Henry Luce, Mollet held up a copy of Nasser's book The Philosophy of the Revolution and said: "This is Nasser's Mein Kampf. If we're too stupid not to read it, understand it and draw the obvious conclusions, then so much the worse for us."

On 29 July 1956, the French Cabinet decided upon military action against Egypt in alliance with Israel, and Admiral Nomy of the French Naval General Staff was sent to Britain to inform the leaders of that country of France's decision, and to invite them to co-operate if interested. At the same time, Mollet felt very much offended by what he considered to be the lackadaisical attitude of the Eisenhower administration to the nationalisation of the Suez Canal Company. This was especially the case because earlier in 1956 the Soviet Foreign Minister Vyacheslav Molotov had offered the French a deal whereby if Moscow ended its support of the FLN in Algeria, Paris would remain in NATO but become "semi-neutralist" in the Cold War.

Given the way that Algeria (which the French considered an integral part of France) had become engulfed in a spiral of increasing savage violence that French leaders longed to put an end to, the Mollet administration had felt tempted by Molotov's offer, but in the end, Mollet, a firm Atlanticist, had chosen to remain faithful to NATO. In Mollet's view, his fidelity to NATO had earned him the right to expect firm American support against Egypt, and when that support proved not forthcoming, he became even more determined that if the Americans were not willing to do anything about Nasser, then France would act.

Commonwealth response 
Among the "White Dominions" of the British Commonwealth, Canada had few ties with the Suez Canal and twice had refused British requests for peacetime military aid in the Middle East. It had little reaction to the seizure before military action. By 1956 the Panama Canal was much more important than Suez to Australia and New Zealand; the following year two experts would write that it "is not vital to the Australian economy". The memory, however, of the two nations fighting in two world wars to protect a canal which many still called their "lifeline" to Britain or "jugular vein", contributed to Australian Prime Minister Robert Menzies and New Zealand Prime Minister Sidney Holland, supporting Britain in the early weeks following the seizure. On 7 August Holland hinted to his parliament that New Zealand might send troops to assist Britain, and received support from the opposition. On 13 August, Menzies, who had travelled to London from the United States after hearing of the nationalisation and became an informal member of the British Cabinet discussing the issue, spoke on the BBC in support of the Eden government's position on the canal. He called the dispute over the canal "a crisis more grave than any since the Second World War ended". An elder statesman of the Commonwealth who felt that Nasser's actions threatened trading nations like Australia, he argued publicly that Western powers had built the canal but that Egypt was now seeking to exclude them from a role in its ownership or management. South Africa's Johannes Strijdom stated "it is best to keep our heads out of the beehive". His government saw Nasser as an enemy but would benefit economically and geopolitically from a closed canal, and diplomatically from not opposing a nation's right to govern its internal affairs.

The "non-white Dominions" saw Egypt's seizing of the canal as an admirable act of anti-imperialism, and Nasser's Arab nationalism as similar to Asian nationalism. Indian Prime Minister Jawaharlal Nehru was with Nasser when he learned of the Anglo-American withdrawal of aid for the Aswan Dam. As India was a major user of the canal, however, he remained publicly neutral other than warning that any use of force, or threats, could be "disastrous". Suez was also very important to the Dominion of Ceylon's economy, and it was renegotiating defence treaties with Britain, so its government was not as vocal in supporting Egypt as it would have likely been otherwise. Pakistan was also cautious about supporting Egypt given their rivalry as leading Islamic nations, but its government did state that Nasser had the right to nationalise.

Western diplomacy 
On 1 August 1956, a tripartite meeting was opened at 10 Downing Street between British Foreign Secretary Selwyn Lloyd, U.S. Ambassador Robert D. Murphy and French Foreign Affairs Minister Christian Pineau.

An alliance was soon formed between Eden and Guy Mollet, French Prime Minister, with headquarters in London. General Hugh Stockwell and Admiral Pierre Barjot were appointed as Chief of Staff. Britain sought co-operation with the United States throughout 1956 to deal with what it maintained was a threat of an Israeli attack against Egypt, but to little effect.

Between July and October 1956, unsuccessful initiatives encouraged by the United States were made to reduce the tension that would ultimately lead to war. International conferences were organised to secure agreement on Suez Canal operations but all were ultimately fruitless.

Almost immediately after the nationalisation, Eisenhower suggested to Eden a conference of maritime nations that used the canal. The British preferred to invite the most important countries, but the Americans believed that inviting as many as possible amid maximum publicity would affect world opinion. Invitations went to the eight surviving signatories of the Constantinople Convention and the 16 other largest users of the canal: Australia, Ceylon, Denmark, Egypt, Ethiopia, France, West Germany, Greece, India, Indonesia, Iran, Italy, Japan, the Netherlands, New Zealand, Norway, Pakistan, Portugal, Soviet Union, Spain, Sweden, Turkey, the United Kingdom, and the United States. All except Egypt—which sent an observer, and used India and the Soviet Union to represent its interests—and Greece accepted the invitation, and the 22 nations' representatives met in London from 16 to 23 August.

15 of the nations supported the American-British-French position of international operation of the canal; Pakistan chose its western allies over its sympathy for Egypt's anti-western position despite resulting great domestic controversy. Ceylon, Indonesia, and the Soviet Union supported India's competing proposal—which Nasser had preapproved—of international supervision only. India criticised Egypt's seizure of the canal, but insisted that its ownership and operation now not change. The majority of 18 chose five nations to negotiate with Nasser in Cairo led by Menzies, while their proposal for international operation of the canal would go to the Security Council.

Menzies' 7 September official communique to Nasser presented a case for compensation for the Suez Canal Company and the "establishment of principles" for the future use of the canal that would ensure that it would "continue to be an international waterway operated free of politics or national discrimination, and with financial structure so secure and an international confidence so high that an expanding and improving future for the Canal could be guaranteed" and called for a convention to recognise Egyptian sovereignty of the canal, but for the establishment of an international body to run the canal. Nasser saw such measures as a "derogation from Egyptian sovereignty" and rejected Menzies' proposals. Menzies hinted to Nasser that Britain and France might use force to resolve the crisis, but Eisenhower openly opposed the use of force and Menzies left Egypt without success.

Instead of the 18-nation proposal, the United States proposed an association of canal users that would set rules for its operation. 14 of the other nations, not including Pakistan, agreed. Britain, in particular, believed that violation of the association rules would result in military force, but after Eden made a speech to this effect in parliament on 12 September, the US ambassador Dulles insisted "we do not intend to shoot our way through" the canal. The United States worked hard through diplomatic channels to resolve the crisis without resorting to conflict. "The British and French reluctantly agreed to pursue the diplomatic avenue but viewed it as merely an attempt to buy time, during which they continued their military preparations." The British, Washington's closest ally, ignored Eisenhower's pointed warning that the American people would not accept a military solution.

On 25 September 1956 the Chancellor of the Exchequer Harold Macmillan met informally with Eisenhower at the White House. Macmillan misread Eisenhower's determination to avoid war and told Eden that the Americans would not in any way oppose the attempt to topple Nasser. Though Eden had known Eisenhower for years and had many direct contacts with him during the crisis, he also misread the situation. The Americans refused to support any move that could be seen as imperialism or colonialism, seeing the US as the champion of decolonisation. Eisenhower felt the crisis had to be handled peacefully; he told Eden that American public opinion would not support a military solution. Eden and other leading British officials incorrectly believed Nasser's support for Palestinian fedayeen against Israel, as well as his attempts to destabilise pro-western regimes in Iraq and other Arab states, would deter the US from intervening with the operation. Eisenhower specifically warned that the Americans, and the world, "would be outraged" unless all peaceful routes had been exhausted, and even then "the eventual price might become far too heavy". London hoped that Nasser's engagement with communist states would persuade the Americans to accept British and French actions if they were presented as a fait accompli. This proved to be a critical miscalculation.

Franco-British-Israeli objectives 
Britain was anxious lest it lose efficient access to the remains of its empire. Both Britain and France were eager that the canal should remain open as an important conduit of oil.

Both the French and the British felt that Nasser should be removed from power. The French "held the Egyptian president responsible for assisting the anti-colonial rebellion in Algeria". France was nervous about the growing influence that Nasser exerted on its North African colonies and protectorates.

Israel wanted to reopen the Straits of Tiran leading to the Gulf of Aqaba to Israeli shipping, and saw the opportunity to strengthen its southern border and to weaken what it saw as a dangerous and hostile state. This was particularly felt in the form of attacks injuring approximately 1,300 civilians emanating from the Egyptian-held Gaza Strip.

The Israelis were also deeply troubled by Egypt's procurement of large amounts of Soviet weaponry that included 530 armoured vehicles, of which 230 were tanks; 500 guns; 150 MiG-15 jet fighters; 50 Ilyushin Il-28 bombers; submarines and other naval craft. The influx of this advanced weaponry altered an already shaky balance of power. Israel was alarmed by the Czech arms deal, and believed it had only a narrow window of opportunity to hit Egypt's army. Additionally, Israel believed Egypt had formed a secret alliance with Jordan and Syria.

Forces

Britain 

British troops were well-trained, experienced, and had good morale, but suffered from the economic and technological limitations imposed by post-war austerity. The 16th Independent Parachute Brigade Group, which was intended to be the main British strike force against Egypt, was heavily involved in the Cyprus Emergency, which led to a neglect of paratroop training in favour of counter-insurgency operations. The Royal Navy could project formidable power through the guns of its warships and aircraft flown from its carriers, but lacked amphibious capability.

The Royal Navy had just undergone a major and innovative carrier modernisation program. The Royal Air Force (RAF) had just introduced two long-range bombers, the Vickers Valiant and the English Electric Canberra, but owing to their recent entry into service the RAF had not yet established proper bombing techniques for these aircraft. Despite this, General Sir Charles Keightley, the commander of the invasion force, believed that air power alone was sufficient to defeat Egypt. By contrast, General Hugh Stockwell, the Task Force's ground commander, believed that methodical and systematic armoured operations centred on the Centurion battle tank would be the key to victory.

France 
French troops were experienced and well-trained but suffered from cutbacks imposed by post-war politics of economic austerity. In 1956, the French Armed Forces was heavily involved in the Algerian war, which made operations against Egypt a major distraction. French paratroopers of the elite Regiment de Parachutistes Coloniaux (RPC) were extremely experienced, battle-hardened, and very tough soldiers, who had greatly distinguished themselves in the fighting in Indochina and in Algeria. The men of the RPC followed a "shoot first, ask questions later" policy towards civilians, first adopted in Vietnam, which was to lead to the killing of a number of Egyptian civilians. The rest of the French troops were described by the American military historian Derek Varble as "competent, but not outstanding".

The main French (and Israeli) tank, the AMX-13, was designed for mobile, flanking operations, which led to a tank that was lightly armoured but agile. General André Beaufre, who served as Stockwell's subordinate, favoured a swift campaign of movement in which the main objective was to encircle the enemy. Throughout the operation, Beaufre proved himself to be more aggressive than his British counterparts, always urging that some bold step be taken at once. The French Navy had a powerful carrier force which was excellent for projecting power inland, but, like its British counterpart, suffered from a lack of landing craft.

Israel 

American military historian Derek Varble called the Israel Defense Forces (IDF) the "best" military force in the Middle East while at the same time suffering from "deficiencies" such as "immature doctrine, faulty logistics, and technical inadequacies". The IDF's Chief of Staff, Major General Moshe Dayan, encouraged aggression, initiative, and ingenuity among the Israeli officer corps while ignoring logistics and armoured operations. Dayan, a firm infantry man, preferred that arm of the service at the expense of armour, which Dayan saw as clumsy, pricey, and suffering from frequent breakdowns.

At the same time, the IDF had a rather disorganised logistics arm, which was put under severe strain when the IDF invaded the Sinai. Most of the IDF weapons in 1956 came from France. The main IDF tank was the AMX-13 and the main aircraft were the Dassault Mystère IVA and the Ouragan. Superior pilot training was to give the Israeli Air Force an unbeatable edge over their Egyptian opponents. The Israeli Navy consisted of two destroyers, seven frigates, eight minesweepers, several landing craft, and fourteen torpedo boats.

Egypt 
In the Egyptian Armed Forces, politics rather than military competence was the main criterion for promotion. The Egyptian commander, Field Marshal Abdel Hakim Amer, was a purely political appointee who owed his position to his close friendship with Nasser. A heavy drinker, he would prove himself grossly incompetent as a general during the Crisis. In 1956, the Egyptian military was well equipped with weapons from the Soviet Union such as T-34 and IS-3 tanks, MiG-15 fighters, Ilyushin Il-28 bombers, SU-100 self-propelled guns and assault rifles.

Rigid lines between officers and men in the Egyptian Army led to a mutual "mistrust and contempt" between officers and the men who served under them. Egyptian troops were excellent in defensive operations, but had little capacity for offensive operations, owing to the lack of "rapport and effective small-unit leadership".

Invasion

Casualties 
British casualties stood at 22 dead and 96 wounded, while French casualties were 10 dead and  The Israeli losses were 172 dead and 817 wounded. The number of Egyptians killed was "never reliably established". Egyptian casualties to the Israeli invasion were estimated at 1,000–3,000 dead and 4,000 wounded, while losses to the Anglo-French operation were estimated at 650 dead and 900 wounded. 1,000 Egyptian civilians are estimated to have died.

End of hostilities

Anti-war protests in Britain 

Although the public believed the British government's justification of the invasion as a separation of Israeli and Egyptian forces, protests against the war occurred in Britain after it began. On the popular television talk show Free Speech, an especially bitter debate took place on 31 October with the leftist historian A. J. P. Taylor and the Labour journalist and future party leader Michael Foot calling their colleague on Free Speech, the Conservative MP Robert Boothby, a "criminal" for supporting the war. One television critic spoke of Free Speech during the war that "the team seemed to not only on the verge of, but actually losing their tempers.... Boothby boomed, Foot fumed and Taylor trephined, with apparent real malice...." The angry, passionate, much-watched debates about the Suez war on Free Speech mirrored the divided public response to the war. The British government pressured the BBC to support the war, and seriously considered taking over the network.

Eden's major mistake had been not to strike in July 1956 when there was widespread anger at Nasser's nationalisation of the Suez Canal Company, as by the fall of 1956 public anger had subsided, with many people in Britain having come to accept the fait accompli, and saw no reason for war. This was especially the case as Eden's claims that the Egyptians would hopelessly mismanage the canal had proven groundless, and that by September 1956 it was clear that the change of management had not affected shipping. Even more importantly, Eden's obsession with secrecy and his desire to keep the preparations for war as secret as possible meant that the Eden government did nothing in the months running up to the attack to explain to the British people why it was felt that war was necessary. Many of the reservists who were called up for their National Service in the summer and fall of 1956 recalled feeling bewildered and confused as the Eden government started preparing to attack Egypt while at the same time Eden insisted in public that he wanted a peaceful resolution of the dispute, and was opposed to attacking Egypt. The British author David Pryce-Jones recalled that as a young officer, after the ultimatum was submitted to Egypt he had to explain to his troops why war with Egypt was necessary without believing a word that he was saying. Only one British soldier, however, refused to fight.

Gaitskell was much offended that Eden had kept him in the dark about the planning for action against Egypt, and felt personally insulted that Eden had just assumed that he would support the war without consulting him first. On 31 October he cited in Parliament the fact that, despite Eden's claim that the British government had consulted closely with the Commonwealth, no other member nation did; in the Security Council, not even Australia had supported the British action. He called the invasion

The stormy and violent debates in the House of Commons on 1 November 1956 almost degenerated into fist-fights after several Labour MPs compared Eden to Hitler. Yet the Prime Minister insisted, "We [are not] at war with Egypt now.[…] There has not been a declaration of war by us. We are in an armed conflict." The British historian A. N. Wilson wrote that "The letters to The Times caught the mood of the country, with great majority opposing military intervention...." The journalist Malcolm Muggeridge and actor Robert Speaight wrote in a public letter that
 The Suez Crisis played a key role in the reconciliation of the Gaitskellite and Bevanite factions of the Labour Party, which both condemned the invasion, after the 1955 leadership election. Gaitskell was so impressed by his erstwhile rival Aneurin Bevan's forceful condemnation of the invasion that he offered him the role of Shadow Foreign Secretary, replacing Alfred Robens.

Lady Violet Bonham Carter, an influential Liberal Party member, wrote in a letter to the Times that

According to public opinion polls at the time, 37% of the British people supported the war while 44% were opposed. The Observer newspaper in a leader (editorial) attacked the Eden government for its "folly and crookedness" in attacking Egypt while The Manchester Guardian urged its readers to write letters of protest to their MPs. The Economist spoke of the "strange union of cynicism and hysteria" in the government and The Spectator stated that Eden would soon have to face "a terrible indictment". The majority of letters written to MPs from their constituents were against the Suez attack. Significantly, many of the letters come from voters who identified as Conservatives. The historian Keith Feiling wrote "the harm done seems to me terrifying: for my part I have resigned from the party while the present leader is there". The law professor and future Conservative cabinet minister Norman St. John-Stevas wrote at the time:

The historian Hugh Trevor-Roper expressed regret that no senior minister resigned and hoped "some kind of national Tory party can be saved from the wreck". A master at Eton College in a letter to his MP declared:

The Labour Party and the Trade Union Congress organised nation-wide anti-war protests, starting on 1 November under the slogan "Law, not war!" On 4 November, at an anti-war rally in Trafalgar Square attended by 30,000 people (making it easily the biggest rally in London since 1945), the Labour MP Aneurin Bevan accused the government of "a policy of bankruptcy and despair". Bevan stated at the Trafalgar rally:

Inspired by Bevan's speech, the crowd at Trafalgar Square then marched on 10 Downing Street chanting "Eden Must Go!", and attempted to storm the Prime Minister's residence. The ensuing clashes between the police and the demonstrators which were captured by television cameras had a huge demoralising effect on the Eden cabinet, which was meeting there. The British historian Anthony Adamthwaite wrote in 1988 that American financial pressure was the key factor that forced Eden to accept a ceasefire, but the public protests, declining poll numbers and signs that many Conservative voters were deserting the government were important secondary factors.

Support for Eden 
According to some historians, the majority of British people were on Eden's side. On 10 and 11 November an opinion poll found 53% supported the war, with 32% opposed.

The majority of Conservative constituency associations passed resolutions of support to "Sir Anthony". Gilbert Murray was among Oxford scholars who signed a statement supporting Eden; such an act by the famous advocate of internationalism amazed both sides. He explained that, if not stopped, he believed Nasserism would become a Soviet-led worldwide anti-western movement. British historian Barry Turner wrote that
 A. N. Wilson wrote that
 The economist Roy Harrod wrote at the time that the "more level-headed British, whom I believe to be in the majority though not the most vocal" were supporting the "notable act of courage and statesmanship" of the government. Eden himself claimed that his mail went from eight to one against the military action immediately after its start, to four to one in support on the day before the ceasefire.

The conflict exposed the division within the Labour Party between its middle-class internationalist intelligentsia who opposed the conflict, and working-class voters who supported it. One Conservative MP wrote: "I have lost my middle-class followers, but this has been at least balanced by backing from working-class electors who normally vote Socialist and who favour a strong line on Suez".

The Labour MP Richard Crossman said that "when the Labour Party leadership tried to organise demonstrations in the Provinces of the kind they'd held in Trafalgar Square, there was great reluctance among the working classes, because we were at war. It was Munich in reverse. And it was very, very acute". Fellow Labour MP James Callaghan agreed: "The horny-handed sons of toil rallied to the call of the bugle. They reacted against us in the same way as they did against Chamberlain a few months after Munich". "My working mates were solidly in favour of Eden", recalled future Labour and SDP MP David Owen. Comparing opposition to Suez to what he described as the Cambridge Apostles's "defeatist, even traitorous" support of pre-World War II appeasement, Owen told Kenneth Harris, "there was Gaitskell ... criticizing Eden, and here were these men working alongside me, who should have been his natural supporters, furious with him. The Daily Mirror backed Gaitskell, but these men were tearing up their Daily Mirrors every day". Callaghan recalled that up until the fighting started "we had public opinion on our side; but as soon as we actually went to war, I could feel the change". Another Labour MP, Barbara Castle, recalled that Labour's protest against the conflict was "drowned in a wave of public jingoism".

During the Lewisham North and Warwick and Leamington by-elections held in February and March 1957, Labour instructed its activists not to emphasise their opposition to Suez because the government's action had considerable support. Callaghan believed that the Conservatives increased their majority at the 1959 election in part because working-class voters were still angry at the party for opposing the conflict. The Labour MP Stanley Evans resigned from his seat and his membership of the party due to his support for British action in Suez.

International reaction 

The operation, aimed at taking control of the Suez Canal, Gaza, and parts of Sinai, was highly successful for the invaders from a military point of view, but was a disaster from a political point of view, resulting in international criticism and diplomatic pressure. Along with the Suez crisis, the United States was also dealing with the near-simultaneous Hungarian revolution. Vice-President Richard Nixon later explained: "We couldn't on one hand, complain about the Soviets intervening in Hungary and, on the other hand, approve of the British and the French picking that particular time to intervene against Nasser". Beyond that, it was Eisenhower's belief that if the United States were seen to acquiesce in the attack on Egypt, that the resulting backlash in the Arab world might win the Arabs over to the Soviet Union.

Despite having no commercial or military interest in the area, many countries were concerned with the growing rift between Western allied nations. The Swedish ambassador to the Court of St. James's, Gunnar Hägglöf wrote in a letter to the anti-war Conservative M.P. Edward Boyle,

The attack on Egypt greatly offended many in the Islamic world. In Pakistan, 300,000 people showed up in a rally in Lahore to show solidarity with Egypt while in Karachi a mob chanting anti-British slogans burned down the British High Commission. In Syria, the government blew up the Kirkuk–Baniyas pipeline that allowed Iraqi oil to reach tankers in the Mediterranean to punish Iraq for supporting the invasion, and to cut Britain off from one of its main routes for taking delivery of Iraqi oil. King Saud of Saudi Arabia imposed a total oil embargo on Britain and France.

When Israel refused to withdraw its troops from the Gaza Strip and Sharm el-Sheikh, Eisenhower declared, "We must not allow Europe to go flat on its back for the want of oil." He sought UN-backed efforts to impose economic sanctions on Israel until it fully withdrew from Egyptian territory. Senate Majority Leader Lyndon B. Johnson and minority leader William Knowland objected to American pressure on Israel. Johnson told the Secretary of State John Foster Dulles that he wanted him to oppose "with all its skill" any attempt to apply sanctions on Israel. Dulles rebuffed Johnson's request, and informed Eisenhower of the objections made by the Senate. Eisenhower was "insistent on applying economic sanctions" to the extent of cutting off private American assistance to Israel which was estimated to be over $100 million a year. Ultimately, the Democratic Party-controlled Senate would not co-operate with Eisenhower's position on Israel. Eisenhower finally told Congress he would take the issue to the American people, saying, "America has either one voice or none, and that voice is the voice of the President – whether everybody agrees with him or not." The President spoke to the nation by radio and television where he outlined Israel's refusal to withdraw, explaining his belief that the UN had "no choice but to exert pressure upon Israel".

On 30 October, the Security Council held a meeting, at the request of the United States, when it submitted a draft resolution calling upon Israel immediately to withdraw its armed forces behind the established armistice lines. It was not adopted because of British and French vetoes. A similar draft resolution sponsored by the Soviet Union was also rejected. On 31 October, also as planned, France and the UK launched an air attack against targets in Egypt, which was followed shortly by a landing of their troops at the northern end of the canal zone. Later that day, considering the grave situation created by the actions against Egypt, and with lack of unanimity among the permanent members preventing it from exercising its primary responsibility to maintain international peace and security, the Security Council passed Resolution 119; it decided to call an emergency special session of the General Assembly for the first time, as provided in the 1950 "Uniting for Peace" resolution, in order to make appropriate recommendations to end the fighting.

The emergency special session was convened 1 November; the same day Nasser requested diplomatic assistance from the U.S., without requesting the same from the Soviet Union; he was at first sceptical of the efficacy of U.S. diplomatic efforts at the UN, but later gave full credit to Eisenhower's role in stopping the war.

In the early hours of 2 November, the General Assembly adopted the United States' proposal for Resolution 997 (ES-I); the vote was 64 in favour and 5 opposed (Australia, New Zealand, Britain, France, and Israel) with 6 abstentions. It called for an immediate ceasefire, the withdrawal of all forces behind the armistice lines, an arms embargo, and the reopening of the Suez Canal, which was now blocked. The Secretary-General was requested to observe and report promptly on compliance to both the Security Council and General Assembly, for further action as deemed appropriate in accordance with the UN Charter. Over the next several days, the emergency special session consequently adopted a series of enabling resolutions, which established the first United Nations Emergency Force (UNEF), on 7 November by Resolution 1001. This proposal of the emergency force and the resulting cease-fire was made possible primarily through the efforts of Lester B. Pearson, the Secretary of External Affairs of Canada, and Dag Hammarskjöld, the Secretary-General of the United Nations. The role of Nehru, both as Indian Prime minister and a leader of the Non Aligned Movement was significant; the Indian historian Inder Malhotra wrote that "Now Nehru—who had tried to be even-handed between the two sides—denounced Eden and co-sponsors of the aggression vigorously. He had a powerful, if relatively silent, ally in the U.S. president Dwight Eisenhower who went to the extent of using America's clout in the IMF to make Eden and Mollet behave".

The Indian historian Inder Malhotra wrote about Nehru's role that: "So the Suez War ended in Britain's humiliation. Eden lost his job. Nehru achieved his objective of protecting Egypt's sovereignty and Nasser's honour". Britain and France agreed to withdraw from Egypt within a week; Israel did not. A rare example of support for the Anglo-French actions against Egypt came from West Germany; though the Cabinet was divided, the Chancellor Konrad Adenauer was furious with the United States for its "chumminess with the Russians" as Adenauer called the U.S. refusal to intervene in Hungary and voting with the Soviet Union at the UN Security Council, and the traditionally Francophile Adenauer drew closer to Paris as a result. Adenauer told his Cabinet on 7 November that Nasser was a pro-Soviet force that needed to cut down to size, and in his view the attack on Egypt was completely justified. Adenauer maintained to his Cabinet that the French had every right to invade Egypt because of Nasser's support for the FLN in Algeria, but the British were partly to blame because they "inexplicably" shut down their Suez Canal base in 1954. What appalled Adenauer about the crisis was that the United States had come against the attack on Egypt and voted with the Soviet Union at Security Council against Britain and France, which led Adenauer to fear that the United States and Soviet Union would "carve up the world" according to their own interests with no thought for the interests of European states. Adenauer refused to cancel a planned visit to Paris on 5–6 November 1956 and his summit with Mollet was clearly meant to be seen as a gesture of moral support. Adenauer was especially worried by the fact that the American embassy in Bonn would not provide a clear answer as to what was the American policy in response to the Bulganin letters. One of Adenauer's aides Fritz von Eckardt commented about the opening ceremony in Paris where Mollet and Adenauer stood side by side while the national anthems were played that "In the most serious hour France had experienced since the end of the war, the two governments were standing shoulder by shoulder". During the summit in Paris, Mollet commented to Adenauer that a Soviet nuclear strike could destroy Paris at any moment, which added considerably to the tension and helped to draw the French and Germans closer.

On 7 November, David Ben-Gurion addressed the Knesset and declared a great victory, saying that the 1949 armistice agreement with Egypt was dead and buried, and that the armistice lines were no longer valid and could not be restored. Under no circumstances would Israel agree to the stationing of UN forces on its territory or in any area it occupied. He also made an oblique reference to his intention to annex the Sinai Peninsula. Isaac Alteras writes that Ben-Gurion 'was carried away by the resounding victory against Egypt' and while 'a statesman well known for his sober realism, [he] took flight in dreams of grandeur.' The speech marked the beginning of a four-month-long diplomatic struggle, culminating in withdrawal from all territory, under conditions far less palatable than those envisioned in the speech, but with conditions for sea access to Eilat and a UNEF presence on Egyptian soil. The speech immediately drew increased international pressure on Israel to withdraw. That day in New York, the emergency session passed Resolution 1002, again calling for the immediate withdrawal of Israeli troops to behind the armistice lines, and for the immediate withdrawal of British and French troops from Egyptian territory. After a long Israeli cabinet meeting late on 8 November, Ben-Gurion informed Eisenhower that Israel declared its willingness to accept withdrawal of Israeli forces from Sinai, 'when satisfactory arrangements are made with the international force that is about to enter the canal zone'.

Soviet threats 
Although the Soviet Union's position in the crisis was as helpless as was the United States' regarding Hungary's uprising, Premier Nikolai Bulganin threatened to intervene on the Egyptian side, and to launch rocket attacks on Britain, France and Israel. Bulganin accused Ben-Gurion of supporting European colonialism, and Mollet of hypocrisy for leading a socialist government while pursuing a right-wing foreign policy. He did however concede in his letter to Eden that Britain had legitimate interests in Egypt.

The Soviet threat to send troops to Egypt to fight the Allies led Eisenhower to fear that this might be the beginning of World War III. One of Eisenhower's aides Emmet Hughes recalled that the reaction at the White House to the Bulganin letters was "sombre" as there was fear that this was the beginning to the countdown to World War III, a war that if it occurred would kill hundreds of millions of people. In private, Eisenhower told Undersecretary of State Herbert Hoover Jr. of his fears that:  If the Soviet Union did go to war with NATO allies Britain and France, then the United States would be unable to remain neutral, because the United States' obligations under NATO would come into effect, requiring them to go to war with the Soviet Union in defence of Britain and France. Likewise, if the Soviet Union attacked Israel, though there was no formal American commitment to defend Israel, the Eisenhower administration would come under heavy domestic pressure to intervene. From Eisenhower's viewpoint, it was better to end the war against Egypt rather than run the risk of this escalating into the Third World War, in case Khrushchev was serious about going to war in defence of Egypt as he insisted in public that he was. Eisenhower's reaction to these threats from the Soviet Union was: "If those fellows start something, we may have to hit 'em — and, if necessary, with everything in the bucket." Eisenhower immediately ordered Lockheed U-2 flights over Syria and Israel to search for any Soviet air forces on Syrian bases, so the British and French could destroy them. He told Hoover and CIA director Allan Dulles, "If the Soviets attack the French and British directly, we would be in a war and we would be justified in taking military action even if Congress were not in session." (The Americans excluded Israel from the guarantee against Soviet attack, however, alarming the Israeli government.) The U-2 showed that Soviet aircraft were not in Syria despite the threats.

Khrushchev often claimed to possess a vast arsenal of nuclear-tipped ICBMs, and while disclaiming any intention of starting a war, maintained that he would be more than happy to turn a conventional war into a nuclear one if war did come. U-2 flights over the Soviet Union, which were intended to discover if the country really did have the nuclear arsenal that it claimed to have, only started in July 1956, and it was not until February 1959 that it firmly established that Khrushchev had vastly exaggerated his nuclear strength. In fact, the supposedly huge Soviet arsenal of ICBMs, with which Khrushchev would wipe out the cities of Britain, France, Israel, and if necessary the United States consisted only of four Semyorka missiles stationed at a swamp south of Arkhangelsk. From the viewpoint of Eisenhower, in 1956 he had no way of knowing for certain whether Khrushchev's nuclear braggadocio was for real or not. Earlier in 1956, Dulles had warned Eisenhower that Khrushchev was "the most dangerous person to lead the Soviet Union since the October Revolution" as Khrushchev was "not a coldly calculating person, but rather one who reacted emotionally. He was obviously intoxicated much of the time and could be expected to commit irrational acts." Khrushchev later admitted in his memoirs that he was not seriously "thinking of going to war" in November 1956 as he claimed at the time as he lacked the necessary ICBMs to make good his threats.

Financial pressure 
The United States also put financial pressure on the UK to end the invasion. Because the Bank of England had lost $45 million between 30 October and 2 November, and Britain's oil supply had been restricted by the closing of the Suez Canal, the British sought immediate assistance from the IMF, but it was denied by the United States. Eisenhower in fact ordered his Secretary of the Treasury, George M. Humphrey, to prepare to sell part of the US Government's Sterling Bond holdings. The UK government considered invading Kuwait and Qatar if oil sanctions were put in place by the US.

Britain's Chancellor of the Exchequer, Harold Macmillan, advised his Prime Minister, Anthony Eden, that the United States was fully prepared to carry out this threat. He also warned his Prime Minister that Britain's foreign exchange reserves simply could not sustain the devaluation of the pound that would come after the United States' actions; and that within weeks of such a move, the country would be unable to import the food and energy supplies needed to sustain the population on the islands. However, there were suspicions in the Cabinet that Macmillan had deliberately overstated the financial situation in order to force Eden out. What Treasury officials had told Macmillan was far less serious than what he told the Cabinet.

In concert with U.S. actions, Saudi Arabia started an oil embargo against Britain and France. The U.S. refused to fill the gap until Britain and France agreed to a rapid withdrawal. Other NATO members refused to sell oil they received from Arab nations to Britain or France.

Ceasefire 

Because the British government faced political and economic pressure, the Prime Minister, Sir Anthony Eden, announced a cease fire on 6 November, warning neither France nor Israel beforehand. Troops were still in Port Said and on operational manoeuvres when the order came from London. Port Said had been overrun, and the military assessment was that the Suez Canal could have been completely taken within 24 hours. Eisenhower initially agreed to meet with Eden and Mollet to resolve their differences, but then cancelled the proposed meeting after Secretary of State Dulles advised him it risked inflaming the Middle Eastern situation further.

Eisenhower was not in favour of an immediate withdrawal of British, French and Israeli troops until the US ambassador to the United Nations, Henry Cabot Lodge Jr. pushed for it. Eden's predecessor Sir Winston Churchill commented on 22 November, "I cannot understand why our troops were halted. To go so far and not go on was madness." Churchill further added that while he might not have dared to begin the military operation, nevertheless once having ordered it he would certainly not have dared to stop it before it had achieved its objective. Without further guarantee, the Anglo-French Task Force had to finish withdrawing by 22 December 1956, to be replaced by Danish and Colombian units of the UNEF.

The Israelis refused to host any UN force on Israeli-controlled territory and withdrew from the Sinai in March 1957. Before the withdrawal the Israeli forces systematically destroyed infrastructure in the Sinai peninsula such as roads, railways and telephone lines, and all houses in the villages of Abu Ageila and El Quseima. Before the railway was destroyed, Israeli troops confiscated Egyptian National Railways equipment including six locomotives and a 30-ton breakdown crane for use by Israel Railways.

The UNEF was formed by forces from countries that were not part of the major alliances (NATO and the Warsaw Pact—though Canadian Armed Forces troops participated in later years, since Canada had spearheaded the idea of a neutral force). By 24 April 1957, the canal was fully reopened to shipping.

Aftermath 

Egyptian sovereignty and ownership of the canal had been confirmed by the United States and the United Nations. In retirement, Anthony Eden, the British Prime Minister at the time, maintained that the military response had prevented a much larger war in the Middle East. In the context of the massive armament of Egypt via Czechoslovakia, Israel had been expecting an Egyptian invasion in either March or April 1957, as well as a Soviet invasion of Syria. The crisis may also have hastened decolonisation, as many of the remaining British and French colonies gained independence over the next few years. Some argued that the imposed ending to the Crisis led to over-hasty decolonisation in Africa, increasing the chance of civil wars and military dictatorships in newly independent countries.

The fight over the canal also laid the groundwork for the Six-Day War in 1967 due to the lack of a peace settlement following the 1956 war and rising of tensions between Egypt and Israel. Additionally, the Soviet Union was able to avoid most repercussions from its concurrent violent suppression of the rebellion in Hungary, and were able to present an image at the United Nations as a defender of small powers against imperialism.

As a direct result of the Crisis and in order to prevent further Soviet expansion in the region, Eisenhower asked Congress on 5 January 1957 for authorisation to use military force if requested by any Middle Eastern nation to check aggression and, secondly, to set aside $200 million to help Middle Eastern countries that desired aid from the United States. Congress granted both requests and this policy became known as the Eisenhower Doctrine.

The Soviet Union made major gains with regards to influence in the Middle East. As American historian John Lewis Gaddis wrote:

Nikita Khrushchev's much publicised threat expressed through letters written by Nikolai Bulganin to begin rocket attacks on 5 November on Britain, France, and Israel if they did not withdraw from Egypt was widely believed at the time to have forced a ceasefire. Accordingly, it enhanced the prestige of the Soviet Union in Egypt, the Arab world, and the Third World, who believed the USSR was prepared to launch a nuclear attack on Britain, France, and Israel for the sake of Egypt. Though Nasser in private admitted that it was American economic pressure that had saved him, it was Khrushchev, not Eisenhower, whom Nasser publicly thanked as Egypt's saviour and special friend. Khrushchev later boasted in his memoirs:

Khrushchev took the view that the Suez crisis had been a great triumph for Soviet nuclear brinkmanship, arguing publicly and privately that his threat to use nuclear weapons was what had saved Egypt. Khrushchev claimed in his memoirs:

The conclusion that Khrushchev drew from the Suez crisis, which he saw as his own personal triumph, was that the use of nuclear blackmail was a very effective tool for achieving Soviet foreign policy goals. Therefore, a long period of crises began, starting with the Berlin crisis (beginning later in November 1958) and culminating in the Cuban Missile Crisis of 1962. U.S. Secretary of State John Foster Dulles perceived a power vacuum in the Middle East, and he thought the United States should fill it. His policies, which ultimately led to the Eisenhower Doctrine, were based on the assumption that Nasser and other Arab leaders shared America's fear of the Soviet Union, which was emphatically not the case. In fact, Nasser never wanted Egypt to be aligned with one single superpower, and instead preferred the Americans and Soviets vying for his friendship.

Nasser saw the Eisenhower Doctrine as a heavy-handed American attempt to dominate the Middle East (a region that Nasser believed he ought to dominate),  and led him to ally Egypt with the Soviet Union as an effective counter-weight. It was only with the quiet abandonment of the Eisenhower Doctrine in a National Security Council review in mid-1958 that Nasser started pulling away from the Soviet Union to resume his preferred role as an opportunist who tried to use both superpowers to his advantage, playing on their animosity.

The American historian Arthur L. Herman says that the episode ruined the usefulness of the United Nations to support American ideals:

Military thought 
The great military lesson that was reinforced by the Suez War was the extent that the desert favoured highly fluid, mobile operations and the power of aerial interdiction. French aircraft destroyed Egyptian forces threatening paratroopers at Raswa and Israeli air power saved the IDF several days' worth of time. To operate in the open desert without air supremacy proved to be suicidal for the Egyptian forces in the Sinai. The Royal Marine helicopter assault at Port Said "showed promise as a technique for transporting troops into small landing zones". Strategic bombing proved ineffective.

Revise Phase II failed to achieve its aim of breaking Egyptian morale while at the same time, those civilian deaths that did occur helped to turn world opinion against the invasion and especially hurt support for the war in Britain. Egyptian urban warfare tactics at Port Said proved to be effective at slowing down the Allied advance. Finally, the war showed the importance of diplomacy. Anglo-French operations against Egypt were militarily successful, but proved to be counterproductive as opinion in both in the home front in Britain and France and the world abroad, especially in the United States, was against the operation.

Europe 
In West Germany, the Chancellor Konrad Adenauer was shocked by the Soviet threat of nuclear strikes against Britain and France, and even more by the quiescent American response to the Soviet threat of nuclear annihilation against two of NATO's key members. The Bulganin letters showcased Europe's dependence upon the United States for security against Soviet nuclear threats while at the same time seeming to show that the American nuclear umbrella was not as reliable as had been advertised. As a result, the French became determined to acquire their own nuclear weapons rather than rely upon the Americans, while Germany became even more interested in the idea of a European "Third Force" in the Cold War. This helped to lead to the formation of the European Economic Community under the 1957 Treaty of Rome, which was intended to be the foundation of the European "Third Force". The European Economic Community was the precursor to the European Union.

Egypt 
With the prompt withdrawal of UK and French troops, later followed by Israeli troop withdraw, Egypt kept control of the Suez Canal. After the fighting ended, the Egyptian Chief-of-Staff Abdel Hakim Amer accused Nasser of provoking an unnecessary war and then blaming the military for the result. The British historian D. R. Thorpe wrote that the outcome gave Nasser "an inflated view of his own power", thinking he had overcome the combined forces of the United Kingdom, France and Israel, failing to attribute their withdrawal to pressure from the superpowers.

Despite the Egyptian defeat, Nasser emerged a hero in the Arab world. American historian Derek Varble commented, "Although Egyptian forces fought with mediocre skill during the conflict, many Arabs saw Nasser as the conqueror of European colonialism and Zionism, simply because Britain, France and Israel left the Sinai and the northern Canal Zone.” The Greek-American historian P. J. Vatikiotis described Nasser's speeches in 1956 and after as providing "superficial explanations of Egypt's military collapse in Sinai, based on some extraordinary strategy" and that "simplistic children's tales about the Egyptian air force's prowess in 1956 were linked in the myth of orderly withdrawal from Sinai. All this was necessary to construct yet another myth, that of Port Said. Inflating and magnifying odd and sporadic resistance into a Stalingrad-like tenacious defense, Port Said became the spirit of Egyptian independence and dignity."

During the Nasser era, the fighting at Port Said become a symbol of Egyptian victory, linked to a global anti-colonial struggle. Of Nasser's post-Suez hubris, Thorpe wrote, "The Six-Day War against Israel in 1967 was when reality kicked in—a war that would never have taken place if the Suez crisis had had a different resolution.” Of Tawfiq al-Hakim's writings about the 1956 and 1967 wars, Vatikiotis summarizes: "Were bluffing and histrionics in the nature of Nasser? It was bluffing that led to the crushing of Egypt in 1967, because of the mass self-deception exercised by leaders and followers alike ever since the non-existent 'Stalingrad which was Port Said' in 1956."

Abolishing civil liberties 

In October 1956, when the Suez Crisis erupted, Nasser brought in a set of sweeping regulations abolishing civil liberties and allowing the state to stage mass arrests without charge and strip away Egyptian citizenship from any group it desired; these measures were mostly directed against the Jews of Egypt. As part of its new policy, 1,000 Jews were arrested and 500 Jewish businesses were seized by the government. A statement branding the Jews as "Zionists and enemies of the state" was read out in the mosques of Cairo and Alexandria. Jewish bank accounts were confiscated and many Jews lost their jobs. Lawyers, engineers, doctors and teachers were not allowed to work in their professions. Thousands of Jews were ordered to leave the country. They were allowed to take only one suitcase and a small sum of cash, and forced to sign declarations "donating" their property to the Egyptian government. Some 25,000 Jews, almost half of the Jewish community left, mainly for Israel, Europe, the United States and South America. By 1957, the Jewish population of Egypt had fallen to 15,000.

Britain 
The political and psychological impact of the crisis had a fundamental impact on British politics. Anthony Eden was accused of misleading parliament and resigned from office on 9 January 1957. Eden had been prime minister for less than two years when he resigned, and his unsuccessful handling of the Suez Crisis eclipsed the successes he had achieved in the previous 30 years as foreign secretary in three Conservative governments.

Eden's successor, Harold Macmillan, accelerated the process of decolonisation and sought to restore Britain's special relationship with the United States. He enjoyed a close friendship with Eisenhower, dating from the North African campaign in World War II, where General Eisenhower commanded allied invasion forces and Macmillan provided political liaison with Winston Churchill. Benefiting from his personal popularity and a healthy economy, Macmillan's government increased its Parliamentary majority in the 1959 general election. The Suez crisis, though a blow to British power in the Near East, did not mark its end. Britain intervened successfully in Jordan to put down riots that threatened the rule of King Hussein in 1958 and in 1961 deployed troops to Kuwait to successfully deter an Iraqi invasion; the latter deployment had been a response to the threats of the Iraqi dictator General Abd al-Karim Qasim that he would invade and annex Kuwait. However, at the same time, though British influence continued in the Middle East, Suez was a blow to British prestige in the Near East from which the country never recovered. Britain evacuated all positions East of Suez by 1971, though this was due mainly to economic factors.

Increasingly, British foreign policy thinking turned away from acting as a great imperial power. During the 1960s there was much speculation that Prime Minister Harold Wilson's continued refusals to send British troops to the Vietnam War, even as a token force, despite President Lyndon B. Johnson's persistent requests, were partially due to the Americans failing to support Britain during the Suez Crisis. Edward Heath was dismayed by the U.S. opposition to Britain during the Suez Crisis; as Prime Minister in October 1973 he refused the U.S. permission to use any of the UK's air bases to resupply during the Yom Kippur War, or to allow the Americans to gather intelligence from British bases in Cyprus.

However, the British relationship with the United States did not suffer lasting consequences from the crisis. "The Anglo-American 'special relationship' was revitalised immediately after the Suez Crisis", writes Risse Kappen. The United States wanted to restore the prestige of its closest ally and thus "The two governments...engaged in almost ritualistic reassurances that their 'special relationship' would be restored quickly". One example came with Britain's first hydrogen bomb test Operation Grapple which led to the 1958 U.S.–UK Mutual Defence Agreement. Six years after the crisis, the Americans amazed the British by selling them state-of-the-art missile technology at a moderate cost, which became the UK Polaris programme.

The war led to the eviction of GCHQ from several of its best foreign signals intelligence collection sites, including the new Perkar, Ceylon site, recently developed at a cost of £2 million (equivalent to £ million in ), and RAF Habbaniya, Iraq.

France 
Risse-Kappen argues that Franco-American ties never recovered from the Suez crisis. There were various reasons for this. Previously there had already been strains in the Franco-American relationship triggered by what Paris considered U.S. betrayal of the French war effort in Indochina at Dien Bien Phu in 1954. The incident demonstrated the weakness of the NATO alliance in its lack of planning and co-operation beyond the European stage. Mollet believed Eden should have delayed calling the Cabinet together until 7 November, taking the whole canal in the meantime, and then veto with the French any UN resolution on sanctions. From the point of view of General Charles de Gaulle, the Suez events demonstrated to France that it could not rely on its allies; the British had initiated a ceasefire in the midst of the battle without consulting the French, while the Americans had opposed Paris politically. The damage to the ties between Paris and Washington, D.C., "culminated in President de Gaulle's 1966 decision to withdraw from the military integration of NATO". The Suez war had an immense impact on French domestic politics. Much of the French Army officer corps felt that they been "betrayed" by what they considered to be the spineless politicians in Paris when they were on the verge of victory just as they believed they had been "betrayed" in Vietnam in 1954, and accordingly become more determined to win the war in Algeria, even if it meant overthrowing the Fourth Republic to do so. The Suez crisis thus help to set the stage for the military disillusionment with the Fourth Republic, which was to lead to the collapse of the republic in 1958. According to the protocol of Sèvres agreements, France secretly transmitted parts of its own atomic technology to Israel, including a detonator.

Israel 

The Israel Defense Forces gained confidence from the campaign. The war demonstrated that Israel was capable of executing large scale military manoeuvres in addition to small night-time raids and counter-insurgency operations. David Ben-Gurion, reading on 16 November that 90,000 British and French troops had been involved in the Suez affair, wrote in his diary, 'If they had only appointed a commander of ours over this force, Nasser would have been destroyed in two days.'

The war also had tangible benefits for Israel. The Straits of Tiran, closed by Egypt since 1950 was re-opened. Israeli shipping could henceforth move freely through the Straits of Tiran to and from Africa and Asia. The Israelis also secured the presence of UN Peacekeepers in Sinai. Operation Kadesh bought Israel an eleven-year lull on its southern border with Egypt.

Israel escaped the political humiliation that befell Britain and France following their swift, forced withdrawal. In addition, its stubborn refusal to withdraw without guarantees, even in defiance of the United States and United Nations, ended all Western efforts, mainly American and British ones, to impose a political settlement in the Middle East without taking Israel's security needs into consideration.

In October 1965 Eisenhower told Jewish fundraiser and Republican party supporter Max M. Fisher that he greatly regretted forcing Israel to withdraw from the Sinai peninsula; Vice-President Nixon recalled that Eisenhower expressed the same view to him on several occasions.

Other parties 
Lester B. Pearson, who would later become the Prime Minister of Canada, was awarded the Nobel Peace Prize in 1957 for his efforts in creating a mandate for a United Nations Peacekeeping Force, and he is considered the father of the modern concept of peacekeeping. The Suez Crisis contributed to the adoption of a new national flag of Canada in 1965, as the Egyptian government had objected to Canadian peacekeeping troops on the grounds that their flag at that time included a British ensign. As Prime Minister, Pearson would advocate the simple Maple Leaf Flag that was eventually adopted.

After Suez, Cyprus, Aden, and Iraq became the main bases for the British in the region while the French concentrated their forces at Bizerte and Beirut. UNEF was placed in the Sinai (on Egyptian territory only) with the express purpose of maintaining the cease-fire. While it was effective in preventing the small-scale warfare that prevailed before 1956 and after 1967, budgetary cutbacks and changing needs had seen the force shrink to 3,378 by 1967.

The Soviet Union, after long peering through the keyhole of a closed door on what it considered a Western sphere of influence, now found itself invited over the threshold as a friend of the Arabs. Shortly after it reopened, the canal was traversed by the first Soviet Navy warships since World War I. The Soviets' burgeoning influence in the Middle East, although it was not to last, included acquiring Mediterranean bases, introducing multipurpose projects, supporting the budding Palestinian liberation movement and penetrating the Arab countries. Nasser claimed to be the defender of the Palestinian cause, but his anti-Israel warlike rhetoric damaged the Palestinians since it convinced many Israelis to oppose reconciliation with the Palestinians.

See also 
 Closure of the Suez Canal (1967–1975)
 Protocol of Sèvres
 Operation Tarnegol
 Egyptian National Military Museum 1956 war hall
 1956 riots in Iraq

General
 United Kingdom–United States relations
 France–United Kingdom relations
 France–United States relations
 Israel–United States relations
 Israeli casualties of war
 List of modern conflicts in the Middle East

Notes

References 

 
 
 
 Bromberger, Merry and Serge Secrets of Suez Sidgwick & Jackson London 1957 (translated from French Les Secrets de l'Expedition d'Egypte by James Cameron)
 
 
 
 
 Doran, Michael. Ike's Gamble, Free Press. Oct.2016.
 
 
 
 
 
 Kingseed, Cole Christian. Eisenhower and the Suez Crisis of 1956 (1995)
 
 
 
 Lahav, Pnina. "The Suez Crisis of 1956 and Its Aftermath: A Comparative Study of Constituons, Use of Force, Diplomacy and International Relations." Boston University Law Review 95 (2015): 1297–1354 online
 
 
 
  pp. 118–130 on historiography
 
 
 
 Pearson, Jonathan. (2002) Sir Anthony Eden and the Suez Crisis: Reluctant Gamble (Springer, 2002). online
 
 
 
 
 Shlaim, Avi. “The Protocol of Sevres, 1956: Anatomy of a War Plot.” International Affairs 73#3 1997, pp. 509–530. online.
 
 Smith, Simon C. ed. Reassessing Suez 1956: New perspectives on the crisis and its aftermath (Routledge, 2016).
 
 
 
 
 Troen, S. Ilan. "The Protocol of Sèvres: British/French/Israeli Collusion Against Egypt, 1956." Israel Studies 1.2 (1996): 122-139 online.
 
 
 
 
 . Chapter 24 is devoted entirely to the Suez Crisis.

Further reading 
 
  (translated from French by Richard Barry)

External links 

 Israel's Second War of Independence, essay in Azure magazine.
 A Man, A Plan and A Canal by Arthur L. Herman
 Sinai Campaign 1956
 Canada and the Suez Crisis
 July 2006, BBC, Suez 50 years on
 Suez and the high tide of Arab nationalism International Socialism 112 (2006)
 Detailed report on the Suez campaign by Ground Forces Chief of Staff General Beaufre, French Defense Ministry archive (French)
 Bodleian Library Suez Crisis Fiftieth anniversary exhibition
 Suez index at Britains-smallwars.com – accounts by British servicemen who were present
 26 July speech by Gamal Abdel Nasser (French translation)
 Speech by Gamal Abdel Nasser (Original text in Arabic)
 

Media links
 Newsreel film, British Prime Minister's broadcast  at Britishpathe.com
 Blue Vanguard (1957), National Film Board of Canada film for the United Nations about its role in restoring peace after the Suez Crisis (60 min, Ian MacNeill, dir.)

 
1956 in All-Palestine (Gaza)
1956 in Egypt
1956 in international relations
1956 in Israel
1957 in All-Palestine (Gaza)
1957 in Egypt
1957 in Israel
October 1956 events in Africa
November 1956 events in Africa
October 1956 events in Asia
November 1956 events in Asia
Invasions of Egypt
British Empire
British military occupations
Egypt–France relations
Egypt–Israel military relations
Egypt–Soviet Union relations
Egypt–United Kingdom military relations
France–Israel relations
France–United Kingdom military relations
Israel–United Kingdom relations
Articles containing video clips